Magdalena Różczka (born 27 July 1978 in Nowa Sól) is a Polish actress. She appeared in the comedy television series Bao-Bab, czyli zielono mi in 2003.

In May 2010 she was appointed as the UNICEF National Goodwill Ambassador.

References

External links 

 
 

Polish film actresses
1978 births
Living people
UNICEF Goodwill Ambassadors
Polish stage actresses
Polish voice actresses
Aleksander Zelwerowicz National Academy of Dramatic Art in Warsaw alumni
People from Nowa Sól